Augusto Masetti (1888–1966) was an Italian anarchist known for an incident at the beginning of the Italo-Turkish War in which he shot his army commanding officer. A military court put him in an insane asylum, a move likely to have avoided creating a cause célèbre in Masetti during an unpopular war had he instead received the expected sentence of death by firing squad. Leftists waged a campaign to free Masetti.

References

Bibliography

Further reading 

 

1888 births
1966 deaths
Italian anarchists